Nomans Land (also mapped "No Man's Land," "No Mans Land," or "No Man's island"),  is an uninhabited island 612 acres (248 ha) in size, located in the town of Chilmark, Dukes County, Massachusetts. It is situated about 3 miles (4.8 km) off the southwest corner of the island of Martha's Vineyard.

The island was used by the United States Navy as a practice bombing range from 1943 to 1996. In 1998, the Navy transferred the island to the United States Fish and Wildlife Service for use as an unstaffed wildlife refuge, which now forms Nomans Land Island National Wildlife Refuge. Due to safety risks from unexploded ordnance and its value as a wildlife habitat, the island is closed to all public use.

History 

In 1602, during the British ship Concords exploration of Cape Cod, Captain Bartholomew Gosnold named Nomans Land "Martha's Vineyard" after his eldest daughter, Martha. However, the name was later transferred to the larger island currently known as Martha's Vineyard, which is located northeast of Nomans Land.

The island was probably named "Nomans Land" after a Martha's Vineyard Wampanoag sachem, Tequenoman, who had jurisdiction over the island when the English came in the early 17th century: named from "TequeNoman's Land" (figurative phrase).

An entail of 1695 mentions that William Nicoll of Islip Grange, Long Island, New York, owned the Island of Normans Land near "Martins Vineyard" recalling the fact that on December 19, 1685, Governor Dongan, Lord of the Manor of Martha's Vineyard (including Normans Land) had made Nicoll his Steward there.

In 1914, Joshua Crane purchased the island for use as a private game preserve. Crane kept pheasants, cattle, and hogs on the island and a caretaker and his family lived on the property year round. During Prohibition, the waters off Nomans Land became a hot spot for rum-running.

During World War II, the Crane family leased the island to the United States Navy. An airfield was constructed by the U.S. Navy on the southern edge of the island between November 1942 and May 1944, and the island was used, beginning in World War II, as Nomans Land Range for 53 years (1943–1996). In 1952, the island was sold by the Cranes to the Navy. The airfield was abandoned by the Navy sometime between 1945 and 1954, though usage as a bombing range continued until 1996.

The eastern third of the island has been managed by the United States Fish and Wildlife Service since 1975. Following an effort to clear the island of ordnance in 1997 and 1998, the rest of the island was transferred to the Fish and Wildlife Service for use as a wildlife refuge, primarily for migratory birds.

Rune stone
A stone covered in runes mentioning the Viking explorer Leif Erikson, believed to be the first European to set foot in North America, was reportedly discovered in 1926 and photographed near the coast of the island. While this suggests that Vikings might have traveled as far south as present-day Massachusetts, and that it is the true location of the settlement of Vinland, archaeologists have considered it a hoax. Translations of the runes on the stone contained unusual grammar as well as Roman numerals, which has led to skepticism about its credibility. Undetonated bombs on and around the island have prevented further investigations.

Sources
 
Blocks 3059 and 3060, Block Group 3, Census Tract 2004, Dukes County United States Census Bureau

References

External links
Nomans Land Island National Wildlife Refuge at the U.S. Fish & Wildlife Service site
James W. Mavor Jr.: The Nomans Runestone & Skywatching Shrines NEARA

Islands of Dukes County, Massachusetts
Uninhabited islands of Massachusetts
Geography of Martha's Vineyard
Buildings and structures in Dukes County, Massachusetts
Coastal islands of Massachusetts
Wampanoag